Dennis "Denny" Hadican is a retired American soccer forward who played professionally in the North American Soccer League.

Hadican attended Saint Louis University, playing on the men's soccer team from 1970 to 1973.  During that time, he was part of three NCAA Men's Division I Soccer Championship teams.  In 1970, he scored the game-winning goal in a 1-0 win over the UCLA Bruins for the national title.  He was inducted into the Billikens Hall of Fame in 2001.
In 1974, the Seattle Sounders selected Hadican in the North American Soccer League draft.  They then traded him to the St. Louis Stars.  He played three games for the Stars in 1975.  The Stars then traded him to the Sounders in exchange for a 1976 draft pick.  In 2002, the St. Louis Soccer Hall of Fame inducted Hadican.

References

External links
 NASL stats

Living people
American soccer players
North American Soccer League (1968–1984) players
Soccer players from St. Louis
Saint Louis Billikens men's soccer players
St. Louis Stars (soccer) players
Year of birth missing (living people)
Association football forwards
NCAA Division I Men's Soccer Tournament Most Outstanding Player winners